The Journal of Spatial Science is an academic journal about spatial sciences published by Taylor & Francis on behalf of the Mapping Sciences Institute (Australia) and the Surveying and Spatial Sciences Institute.
It covers cartography, geodesy, geographic information science, hydrography, digital image analysis and photogrammetry, remote sensing, surveying and related areas.
Its editor-in-chief is Graeme Wright;
its 2018 impact factor is 1.711.

It started in 2004 as a continuation of both Cartography (1954-2003) and Australian Surveyor (1928-2003).
It also absorbed Geomatics Research Australasia (1995-2004), a continuation of the Australian Journal of Geodesy, Photogrammetry, and Surveying (1979-1994).

References

Academic journals associated with learned and professional societies of Australia
Taylor & Francis academic journals
Earth and atmospheric sciences journals
Remote sensing journals
Cartography journals
Geodesy
Hydrography
Photogrammetry
Surveying